In the board game Go, a  is a tactical situation created in positions when both players have groups striving to capture each other, in some closely delimited area of the board. Typically it is not possible for each side to create a safe group with two eyes.

One common outcome is that one group is captured, resolving the race. In the most simple situations it is possible to predict this result, by counting the liberties on each group: if for example there are four liberties each, the advantage will lie with the player able to play first, while if one side has four liberties and the other five, the result is already decided and neither player will continue (the player who is behind will normally leave the area alone, seeing it as a future source of ko threats).

There are numerous other possible outcomes, for example a seki, a ko of a direct or indirect nature, and (rather rarely) more exotic types of repeating situation such as triple ko or chosei. In the more orthodox races some theory is available to help understand the status as far as liberties goes, when these are not completely WYSIWYG; but such theories are not so far able to give an exhaustive description of all capturing races.

Example

See also 

 International Go Federation

External links
Sensei's Library page

Go strategy and tactics